Irina Nikitina (born 21 March 1990) is a Russian handball player who plays for HC Astrakhanochka and the Russia national team.

International honours 
EHF Champions League:
Finalist: 2014
EHF Cup:
Winner: 2012

References
 

    
1990 births
Living people 
Sportspeople from Tolyatti 
Russian female handball players 
Expatriate handball players
Russian expatriates in Hungary